Corisol may refer to:
Cortisol
Epinephrine, by the trade name Corisol